BAA Indianapolis was a planned basketball team in the Basketball Association of America (BAA), a forerunner of the modern National Basketball Association (NBA), based in Indianapolis. They ceased operation before the start of the 1946–47 BAA season.

See also
Basketball Association of America

References

Defunct basketball teams in the United States
Sports teams in Indianapolis
Defunct National Basketball Association teams
Basketball Association of America teams